Dreamworld Corroboree is a collection of wildlife attractions at the Dreamworld amusement park on the Gold Coast, Queensland, Australia. The area is divided into several subsections which allow guests to view the animals in their natural habitats. Dreamworld Corroboree is a registered zoo with 800 native and barnyard animals located within the Dreamworld grounds.

History
Koala Country was Dreamworld's original wildlife exhibit, opening in 1987. After major redevelopment, the Australian Wildlife Experience opened in 2001, featuring Koala Country as one of five wildlife zones. During the redevelopment, access to Koala Country was limited. The new development required the reworking of the Dreamworld Railway tracks causing the train to drive a portion of the circuit backwards during construction. The redevelopment cost A$5 million.

On 9 July 2012 at Dreamworld, the Australian Minister for Tourism Martin Ferguson announced that the Australian Government would contribute $1.1 million to the redevelopment of the Australian Wildlife Experience into an Indigenous tourist experience. Dreamworld's owners, Ardent Leisure, vowed to match the grant in order to have the $2.2 million redeveloped area open by late 2013. Dreamworld has previously worked with the Indigenous community to develop the Dreamworld Dreamtime show in 2010 and 2011. Dreamworld Corroboree officially opened to the public on 12 December 2013.

In 2017, Dreamworld CEO Craig Davidson announced that the stage 2 development for the Dreamworld Corroboree would be complete. Later that year, the dormant Sky Link Chairlift stations were removed, Avis Vintage Cars underwent a refurbishment and rebranded into Vintage Car Adventure and the area added more references towards Torres Strait Islanders. A interactive smart lab was also proposed however it never opened. The lab is still proposed however.

Attractions

Badu
Badu is an outdoor show theatre dedicated to the Torres Strait Islanders which opened in 2018. Torres Strait Island performances are performed at the show theatre. Badu is located next to the Crocodile enclosure. Badu is named after the Badu Island.

Dreamworld Express

The Dreamworld Express has two stops at the Dreamworld Corroboree. The first stop is at Billabong Station which primarily serves ABC Kids World. The second is located behind the Bunya Traders gift shop. The train then continues to Rocky Hollow Station, located at the Rocky Hollow section of the Gold Rush Country area, before terminating back at Central Park Station, located at Main Street. The attraction opened in 1981 as the Cannonball Express.

Humpy
Humpy (also known as the Dreamworld Corrboree Theatre) is a exhibit featuring aboriginal art and stories. The theatre also features films produced by aboriginal musician David Hudson. The theatre also hosts aboriginal VR experiences. The building's exterior represents a humpy, a small shelter used by aboriginals.

Rainbow Serpent
The Rainbow Serpent is a tunnel located near The Giant Drop which opened in 2018. The tunnel is themed to the rainbow serpent, an immortal being and creating God in Aboriginal Mythology. The tunnel has information boards about the rainbow serpent and plays snake noises.

Vintage Car Adventure

Vintage Car Adventure is a fixed track car ride with scaled-down Ford Model T cars fixed onto a concrete track with a single guide rail. The ride was relocated from its original location due to the placement of Mick Doohan's Motocoaster ride in 2007. The ride opened in 1981 with the park in the Rivertown area of the park. The fourteen replicas cars each seat four people and were purchased for A$12,000 each.

Wildlife exhibits

Bilby House
The Bilby House is an exhibit where guests can get up close with the critically endangered bilby marsupial animal. The exhibit is specifically designed for bilbies as it is a semi-nocturnal house.

Daintree Rainforest
Daintree Rainforest is an exhibit of animals which live in tropical climates. Animals include cassowaries, red-legged pademelons, tree frogs, green tree pythons and a scrub python.

Dreamworld Woolshed
Dreamworld Woolshed is a woolshed which features wool animals such as sheep and  a sheep dog. The Dreamworld Woolshed is home to the Australian Sheep Shearing Show. The woolshed opened in 2010 replacing the former Farmyard Friends barn.

Kakadu Wetlands
Kakadu Wetlands is an exhibit of reptiles which features two crocodile pools for both Fresh and Saltwater crocodiles. A crocodile feeding show is held daily. Kakadu Wetlands is also home to a collection of turtles, magpie geese, water hens and brolgas.

Koala Country

Koala Country is an exhibit focusing on Dreamworld's collection of 58 koalas, including the first blue-eyed koala known to be born in captivity. The "Cuddle a Koala" feature allows guests to have a photo professionally taken holding one of the park's koalas. This section also features kangaroos which guests can feed and pet. When opening in 1987, Koala Country was home to just 14 koalas.

Outback Adventure
Outback Adventure is an exhibit for Australian animals native to outback habitat. The area includes dingos, red kangaroos, emus, southern hairy-nosed wombats, snakes, pythons, geckos, monitors, shingle-backs and other arid lizards.

Presentations

Australian Sheep Shearing Show
Located in the Dreamworld Woolshed, the Australian Sheep Shearing Show is an interactive show held several times a day set against an outback station and providing visitors with a taste of life on an Australian farm. It showcases the abilities of farm dogs and shearing of a sheep. Guests get to try some damper and billy tea at the conclusion of the show.

Crocodile Talk
The Crocodile Talk is an informative animal presentation of the park's saltwater crocodiles. The presentation are held at the Kakadu Wetlands exxhibit.

Wildlife Talk
The Wildlife Talk is an informative animal presentation of some of the animal located within the corroboree. The presentation is held near the Arid wildlife exhibit.

Other
Dreamworld Corroboree also features presentations based on the Aboriginal culture, including demonstrations of traditional music, making fire, and cultural weapons.

The Australian Animal Presentation was a show which displayed a selection of animals from the critically endangered bilby to crocodiles, snakes, cockatoos and koalas. Guests had the opportunity to get up close and take photographs with the wildlife. The show ran from 2009 to 2013.

Shopping and dining
The Dreamworld Corroborree offers several of food and shopping outlets themed to Australian animals and indigenous Australia.
Guests can purchase merchandise at:
 Bunya Traders Gift Shop (formerly Croc Creek Traders) — Indigenous Australian and Australian animal themed merchandise
 Koala Photos — guests can cuddle a koala and receive a photograph of them. Aboriginal themed merchandise can also be purchased.
Guests buy food and beverage items at:
 Billabong Buffett Restaurant (formerly Riverwalk Restaurant) — a Buffett restaurant 
 Presto’s Training Cafe (formerly Kai-Kai Café & formerly Kakadu Cafe) — offers a variety bush tucker inspired food such as pies, assorted sandwiches and deserts. The cafe also sells its own coffee brand. The cafe is a unique social venture between The Preston Campbell Foundation and Dreamworld.

See also
 Dreamworld Wildlife Foundation
 Tiger Island

References

Themed areas in Dreamworld (Australia)
Dreamworld (Australia)
Amusement rides introduced in 2001
2001 establishments in Australia
Zoos in Queensland
Wildlife parks in Australia